Jefferson Gomes de Oliveira (born 26 January 1988), commonly known as Sassá, is a Brazilian footballer who plays as a forward.

He played in Brazil, South Korea and Jordan. On the summer of 2018 he signed a contract with Hungarian premier division club Kisvárda.

References

1988 births
Living people
Brazilian footballers
Footballers from Rio de Janeiro (city)
Association football forwards
Bangu Atlético Clube players
Vitória F.C. players
U.D. Oliveirense players
Volta Redonda FC players
Associação Desportiva Cabofriense players
Daejeon Hana Citizen FC players
Esporte Clube Juventude players
Al-Ramtha SC players
Associação Atlética Portuguesa (RJ) players
Kisvárda FC players
Clube Esportivo Aimoré players
Brazilian expatriate footballers
Expatriate footballers in Portugal
Brazilian expatriate sportspeople in Portugal
Expatriate footballers in South Korea
Brazilian expatriate sportspeople in South Korea
Expatriate footballers in Jordan
Brazilian expatriate sportspeople in Jordan
Expatriate footballers in Hungary
Brazilian expatriate sportspeople in Hungary
K League 1 players
Nemzeti Bajnokság I players